Bolbanabad ( and ) also Romanized as Bolbānābād; also known as Bolbolānābād, Būl-e Bandābād, and Būl Bandābād) is a city and capital of Bolbanabad District, in Dehgolan County, Kurdistan Province, Iran. At the 2016 census, its population was 3,207, in 943 families.

The village is populated by Kurds.

References

Towns and villages in Dehgolan County
Cities in Kurdistan Province
Kurdish settlements in Kurdistan Province